Bailey Webster (born July 21, 1991) is an American female volleyball player. She is part of the United States women's national volleyball team.

She participated in the 2014 FIVB Volleyball World Grand Prix.
On club level she played for University of Texas in 2014.

References

External links
 Profile at FIVB.org
 http://www.texassports.com/roster.aspx?rp_id=4332
 http://www.espn.com/espnw/athletes-life/article/9608061/espnw-texas-longhorns-hitter-bailey-webster-learns-love-volleyball
 http://www.baltimoresun.com/news/maryland/bal-va.webster13p220081113124806-photo.html
 http://www.seniorclassaward.com/athletes/bailey_webster/

1991 births
Living people
American women's volleyball players
Place of birth missing (living people)
Texas Longhorns women's volleyball players